Gori may refer to:

Places
 Gori, Burkina Faso
 Gori, Chad
 Gori, Ethiopia
 Gori, Georgia
 Gori District, Georgia
 Gori shola, India
 Gori River, India
 Lake Gori, Iran
Gori, Benin

History
 Goguryeo,  also called Gori
 Goryeo,  also called Gori
 Takri Kingdom,  also called Gori

People
 Gori (surname)
 Gori (comedian) (born 1972), stage name of the Japanese comedian Toshiyuki Teruya
 Gori, bass guitarist in the Japanese rock band Back-On
 Gori, a short form for Gorilla, used as a nickname in Japan, in both well-meaning and derogatory ways depending on context
 Gori (actress), Pakistani former actress.
 Gori (footballer) (born 2002), Spanish footballer

Art & cultures
 Gori (album), a 2002 album by A Band of Boys

See also
 Gory (disambiguation)
 Gora (disambiguation)
 Ghori (disambiguation)
 Jouri, an Arabic female name